Meri Gudiya was an Indian television fantasy drama series which premiered on 16 December 2019 and is telecasted on Star Bharat. A remake of the Tamil serial Neeli, which inturn is a remake of Kannada serial Neeli, aired on Star Suvarna, it starred Aalisha Panwar and Jinisha Bhadhuri. It ended on 20 March, 2020 due to the Corona pandemic.

The production and broadcast of the show was indefinitely halted due to the COVID-19 pandemic lockdown in India in late March 2020.  It was later announced that the show will not be brought back after the lockdown bringing the show to an abrupt ending.

Plot

It showcases the unconditional love of a mother for her daughter. The story revolves around the Gujral family who lives in Shimla. Raghvendra Gujral is a successful businessman who runs his ancestral business of coffee plantations, his wife Madhuri who is an extremely protective mother and their 7-year-old daughter Avi.
A protective and loving mother, Madhuri surprises her daughter Avi with a doll for her birthday. Elsewhere, a mysterious cult gathers in a forest.Avi meets with an accident after Dadi is warned about an ill-omen. While Madhuri performs a miracle, Rudraksha comes one step closer to Avi.Rudraksha releases an evil spirit from a jar, which takes the form of a small girl. He follows Madhuri's car while Ratri plans to kill Avi.Madhuri panics when Avi goes missing from the park while Ratri loses her focus from her. Later, Adrika enters the school disguising herself as a small girl.Ratri learns that Raghav is Avi's father and gets jealous to spot him with Madhuri. Later, she makes a vicious attempt to kill Avi.Ratri gets another chance to harm Avi after failing to push her off the balcony. While Madhuri rushes to save Avi, Ratri executes her diabolical ploy.To ward the evil off from Avi, Madhuri undertakes a painful ritual. While Ratri implements her diabolical plan, Madhuri gets into a serious accident.Madhuri gets severely injured in an accident while Rudraksha assigns a task to Ratri. Later, some devastating news awaits Avi when she arrives at the hospital.The doctors are stunned by Madhuri's progress while Avi misses her a lot. After telling Madhuri her plan, Ratri unplugs the machine that is keeping her alive.Raghav is heartbroken after Madhuri's demise. While Ratri assures Rudraksh of finishing the job, a strange event at Madhuri's funeral leaves everyone stunned.Raghav and his family recollect their memories with Madhuri. While Avi misses her mom and is adamant to meet her, Rudraksh learns a surprising fact.Avi fails to notice a paranormal event when she decides to visit the hospital by herself. Spotting Avi alone on the street, Ratri informs Rudraksh about the situation.Raghav thanks Ratri for rescuing Avi while his mother insists he tells his daughter the truth. After much contemplation, Raghav tries to tell Avi about Madhuri.An apologetic Avi hugs her family members after watching an emotional video of Madhuri. Elsewhere, Rudraksha gets an intuition about an impending danger.Pari creates colourful butterflies to make Avi happy while Ratri decides to win Raghav's love. Later, Dadi learns that Avi's life is in danger.Dadi tries to inform Shaurya and Raghav about the danger approaching Avi. With an evil plan in mind, Ratri prepares a special meal for the family.Ratri is irked as Avi remains unscathed while Pari's lullaby song for Avi reminds Raghav of Madhuri. Later, Rudraksha senses a secret power protecting Avi.Raghav stops Ratri from wearing Madhuri's nightgown. Later, Rudraksha wonders about the supernatural power protecting Avi from his vicious trap.A playful Avi disturbs the employees of Raghav's office while Ratri hatches a cunning plan to get her. Later, Piya discusses her ominous intuition with Raghav.Raghav gets mad at Avi about her rude behaviour. While Raghav's brother expresses concern about Ratri's intentions, she plans to do the unthinkable.Ratri plans to celebrate Madhuri's birthday to get closer to Raghav and Avi. Later, Avi is delighted upon receiving a grand surprise from Ratri.Raghav and Dadi are impressed by Ratri's efforts to keep Avi happy while he thanks her for her sacrifice. Later, Avi gets upset when Pari goes missing.Raghav wins the businessman of the year award while Avi is on a mission to find Pari. Later, Rudraksha is asked to present the award to Raghav.Rudraksha presents Raghav with the 'Businessman of the Year' award while the latter credits Madhuri for his success. Later, Ratri takes Raghav to Rudraksha.Shaurya gets distressed when Raghav decides to let Adrika stay in the house. Later, Pari learns about Adrika and Ratri's vicious ploy for Avi.Adrika hypnotises Raghav's servant and instructs him to kill Avi. While Pari struggles to save Avi, Raghav has a fond recollection of Madhuri.Shaurya notices Ratri hiding something in Avi's room after the family hears the latter scream. While an enraged Ratri confronts Adrika, Shaurya gets a vital clue.Adrika considers Dadi as a threat to her plan and decides to kill her. Elsewhere, Dadi learns about Avi's special powers after meeting Guruji.Adrika hypnotises Shaurya to find out about her magical knife and Dadi's secret place. Later, Dadi decides to get Ratri married to Raghav.When Raghav refuses to heed Dadi's proposals, Ratri brews a new plan to fulfil her motives. What's her plan?Ratri spikes Avi's water bottle while pretending to leave the house. After Avi falls unconscious, Adrika's shocking revelation leaves Ratri speechless.The doctor declares Avi dead while Ratri implements her plan after noticing a strange occurrence. Later, Raghav's mother breaks her 7-year vow of silence.Raghav's mother takes a drastic step when Ratri gets ready to leave the house. While Pari's plan takes a turn for the worse, Raghav is asked to marry Ratri.Pari destroys Ratri's magical tools. While Shaurya and Piya team up to expose Ratri, Dadi decides to get the latter engaged to Raghav.An excited Ratri decks herself up for her engagement with Raghav. While Dadi prepares for the function, Pari finds an odd way to hinder the ceremony.Adrika takes a risk to learn Dadi's secret while Ratri is disheartened when her engagement gets postponed. Later, Guruji rebukes Dadi for breaking her silence.Pari helps a tensed Avi with her homework while Adrika and Rudraksha suspect Dadi to be protecting Avi. Later, Adrika executes a deadly plan.A depressed Avi misses her mom when Ratri refuses to help her out. While Raghav gets a shocking revelation, Adrika approaches Avi with devious intent.Adrika implements an evil plan to kill Avi. While Pari grows anxious about Sushma Dadi's visit, Ratri finds it difficult to please the latter.Ratri is irked when Sushma Dadi constantly compares her with Madhuri. While Sunny waits for an opportunity to break Pari, Avi welcomes unwanted trouble.Raghav saves Avi from getting injured while Rangoli tells her the meaning of a stepmother. Later, Ratri urges Adrika to confess her feelings to Rudraksha.Sunny gets frightened when Pari uses her magic while Piya reveals a startling fact to Shaurya. Later, Sunny locks Avi in the bathroom and takes Pari away.Ignoring Avi's plea for help, Ratri exploits the situation to her benefit. While Avi falls unconscious, an infuriated Raghav stuns Ratri.Ratri and Adrika hatch an evil plan while Priya desperately tries to contact Dr Rudraksh. Later, Pari traps Ratri and Adrika in a circle of fire.Raghav burns his hands while Avi snatches Madhuri's jewellery from Ratri. Later, Pari vows to foil Raghav and Ratri's Sangeet celebration.Piya and Shaurya execute their plan while Ratri tries to get rid of Avi from the function. During the sangeet ceremony, Pari spoils Ratri and Raghav's dance.While Avi prays fervently to God asking to talk to Madhuri, Pari attempts to fight off a large snake. Later, Avi is stunned by a miraculous event.Avi makes a stunning statement during Ratri's mehndi ceremony. Later, Piya learns the shocking truth as she spies on Adrika's conversation with Ratri.Piya gets stabbed while trying to escape from Rudraksha's lair. While Raghav expresses his gratitude to Ratri, Rudraksha calls upon a demon named Roopasur to kill Avi.Ratri gets suspicious upon spotting a special mark on Roopasur's neck. After abducting Pari, Rudraksha rejoices at the success of his diabolical plan.Gurudev senses Madhuri's spirit and asks her to confront her worst nightmare. While Rudraksha traps Ratri in a cage, Gurudev empowers Madhuri to save Avi.Rudraksha is startled to witness Madhuri's unique form during their battle. Elsewhere, Adrika attempts to help Ratri escape from a magical cage.Ratri injures herself during her search for Avi. While Madhuri is in trouble, Ratri makes a shocking announcement to the family.Ratri decides to leave the house after confessing her sins to the Gujrals. While Dadi takes an unexpected decision, Guruji makes a strange promise to Madhuri.While Guruji shows Madhuri a way to return to Avi, the latter desperately searches for Pari. Later, Ratri's Haldi ceremony commences in high spirits.Shaurya helps Raghav comes to terms with reality while Adrika spikes Avi's juice. As the marriage ceremony is about to begin, Madhuri makes her way to the venue.Raghav and Ratri's wedding ceremony commences in high spirits. While Ratri is happy about her wish coming true, Madhuri's entry brings the function to a halt.Madhuri faces a tough time proving that she isn't an imposter. Later, Ratri is left speechless by Shaurya and his mother's decision.Avi surprises Madhuri with cookies while spending some quality time together. Later, Avi makes a request to Madhuri for Mahashivratri.Despite Adrika spiking her drink, Madhuri gives a stunning Shivratri dance performance. Later, she gives Ratri and Adrika a final warning while Rahu seeks vengeance.Ratri vows revenge against Madhuri while Rahu arrives at the house in disguise. Later, he gets reborn in a human form from a pool of boiling water.The family is delighted to meet Rahu after a long time. While Rahu brews a cunning plan against Raghav, Madhuri gets suspicious of his intentions.Madhuri feels excluded but puts on a smile for Avi while Raghav becomes emotionless. Later, the Gujrals are shocked when Madhuri stands up to Raghav.Rahu's diabolical spell takes effect on Raghav, turning him evil. Later, Madhuri leaves the family baffled as she strikes Raghav down.Rahu taunts Madhuri while the Gujrals rush Raghav to the hospital. Later, the police barge into the hospital and arrest Madhuri.While Madhuri makes a thrilling escape from the police station, Krohini tries to kill Raghav and Avi. Later, the Gujrals witness a miracle at the hospital.While an infuriated Rahu decides to punish Krohini, Raghav brings Madhuri back into the house. At night, Rahu tries to get close with Madhuri.Rahu threatens to kill Krohini's children unless she does his bidding. Later, Madhuri is taken aback by Raghav's unexpected statement and warns Rahu.Krohini pretends to be the tooth fairy after Avi catches her while Rahu gives Ratri some advice. Later, Madhuri takes a big risk for Avi and gets into a tough spot.Madhuri struggles to save Avi as Krohini accomplishes her mission. While Rahu gives Krohini a deadline, Madhuri looks on helplessly as Avi gets kidnapped.Desperate to save her children, Krohini manages to trick Avi and accomplish Rahu's orders. Later, Madhuri finds a vital clue that could help her find Avi.Rahu creates Avi's duplicate to fulfil his evil mission. Under the influence of Rahu, Krohini attempts to put Avi into the blazing fire.Madhuri begs Krohini to stop her diabolical attack on Avi. Later, Madhuri is shocked to witness Avi's changed behaviour.Rahu executes his cunning plan to use Avi to reach the Patal Lok. While Madhuri suspects Rahu behind the evil occurrences, Avi does the unthinkable.The Gujrals decide to go for a picnic despite Madhuri's reluctance. While Avi helps Rahu in his mission, Madhuri is shocked to find the entire family in danger.Avi gets scared when she comes face-to-face with a demon. Later, Madhuri learns about duplicate Avi's identity and meets Ketu in the Patal Lok.Madhuri discloses the mystery behind her death to the Gujrals. While Raghav asks Ratri to leave the house, she warns him of dire consequences.While Ketu launches a diabolical attack on the family, Avi infuriates Rahu by striking him. Later, Madhuri sets out on a mission to rescue Avi.Raghav encounters with a vicious Ketu while he searches for Avi and Madhuri. While Ratri seeks Adrika's help to get her released from the prison, Madhuri meets Vasuki.Rahu creates a gang of Asuras to fight Madhuri while Adrika gets Ratri released from jail. With an intent to kill, Ratri and Adrika storm into the Gujral house.Madhuri and Rahu get into a deadly clash while Avi regains consciousness. Elsewhere, the family is stunned upon receiving a shocking piece of news.

Cast

Main

Aalisha Panwar as Madhuri "Mads" Gujral: Avi's mother and Raghav's wife (2019–2020, dead character)
 Jinisha Bhaduri as Avi Gujral: Madhuri and Raghavendra Daughter (2019–2020)

Recurring
Gaurav S Bajaj as Raghavendra "Raghav" Gujral: Avi's father and Madhuri's husband (2019–2020)
Vineet Raina as Rahu: Madhuri's Enemy (2020)
Vidisha as Ratrita "Ratri" Arora Gujral: Raghav's second wife (2019–2020)
Nishigandha Wad as Parvati Gujral: Avi's grandmother, Raghav and Shaurya's mother (2019–2020)
 Rahul Singh as Dr. Rudraksh Kaushal (2019–2020)
 Samvedna Suwalka as Piya: Raghav's secretary (2020)
 Sagar Parekh as Shaurya Gujral: Raghav's younger brother (2019–2020)
 Jasmeet Kaur as Adhrika Arora: Ratri's sister (2019–2020) 
 Surendra Pal as Rajendra "Guruji" Sherawat (2020)

Production

The first promo of the series was released on 13 November 2019 where Aalisha Panwar and Child actress Jinisha Bhaduri were introduced.

Talking about the series, Star Bharat spokesperson said, “With the launch of Meri Gudiya, we want our audiences to witness the undying affection and concern of a mother for her daughter."

Anirudh Pathak, the show's producer, said, “Audience has seen many shows on the mother-daughter bond but the unique concept of the show ‘Meri Gudiya’ revolves around a doll depicting the role of a mother. It's a show that will portray the eternal bond a mother shares with her child even after her death."

Broadcast

This show was premiered on 16 December 2019.The shooting of the show was halted due to COVID-19 pandemic lockdown in India in late March. It was later announced that the show will be not brought be back, bringing the show to an abrupt ending.

References 

Star Bharat original programming
2019 Indian television series debuts
Indian drama television series